is a Japanese diasporic term used in countries, particularly in North America and in South America, to specify the great-great-grandchildren of Japanese immigrants (Issei).  The children of Issei are Nisei (the second generation).  Sansei are the third generation, and their offspring are Yonsei.  The children of at least one Yonsei parent are called Gosei.

The character and uniqueness of the Gosei is recognized in its social history.  The Gosei are the subject of on-going academic research in the United States and Japan.

History 

The earliest organized group of Japanese emigrants settled in Mexico in 1897. Today, the four largest populations of Japanese and descendants of Japanese immigrants live in United States, Canada, Brazil and Peru.  Gosei is a term used in these geographic areas outside Japan.  Gosei characterizes the child of at least one Yonsei (fourth generation) parent.  Differences among these national Gosei developed because of the varying historical processes through which their Japanese emigrant forebears became Nikkei.

Gosei in the US 

The lives of Japanese-Americans of earlier generations contrasts with the Gosei because they have English-speaking grandparents.  According to a 2011 columnist in The Rafu Shimpo of Los Angeles, "Younger Japanese Americans are more culturally American than Japanese" and "other than some vestigial cultural affiliations, a Yonsei or Gosei is simply another American."

Gosei in Canada 

Japanese-Canadian Gosei are entirely acculturated, as is typical for any ethnic group.

Gosei in Peru 

Japanese-Peruvian (Nipo-peruano) Gosei make up less than 1.0% of the Nikkei population in 2000. They are represented by the Asociación Peruano Japonesa.

Gosei in Brazil 

Japanese-Brazilians (Nipo-brasileiro) make up the largest Japanese population in South America, numbering an estimate of less than 242,543 (including those of mixed-race or mixed-ethnicity), more in the 1.8 million in the United States.  The Gosei are a small part of the ethnic minority in that South American nation in the last decades of the 20th century. In 1990, 0.8% of the Nipo-Brasileiros community were Gosei.

Cultural profile

Generations 

The term Nikkei (日系) encompasses all of the world's Japanese immigrants across generations.  In North America, the Gosei are among the heirs of the "activist generation" known as the Sansei.

Notes

References 
 Masterson, Daniel M. and Sayaka Funada-Classen. (2004), The Japanese in Latin America: The Asian American Experience. Urbana, Illinois: University of Illinois Press. ; 
 Nomura, Gail M. (1998).  "Japanese American Women," in The Reader's Companion to U.S. Women's History (Mankiller, Barbara Smith, ed.). Boston: Houghton Mifflin. ;  OCLC 43338598

Further reading 
 Björklund, Krister. (2007).  "Migration in the Interests of the Nation," Siitrtolaisuusinstituuti, Web Reports No. 25.
 Nabão, Rosangela Martins.  "O estudo de nomes próprios de Nipo-Brasileiros: geração issei e geração nissei" ("The study of names of Nipo-Brazilians: Issei generation and Nissei generation"), Revista Trama (Brasil). Vol. 3, No. 5. 1º Semestre de 2007, pp. 181–192.

External links 
 Japanese American National Museum;  JANM generational teas
 Embassy of Japan  in Washington, DC
 Japanese American Citizens League
 Japanese Cultural & Community Center of Northern California
 Japanese American Community and Cultural Center of Southern California
 Japanese American Historical Society
 Densho: The Japanese American Legacy Project
 Japanese American Museum of San Jose, California
 Japanese American Network
 Nikkei Federation
 Discover Nikkei
  Asociación Peruano Japonesa,   El Museo de la Inmigración Japonesa al Perú

Cultural generations
Japanese-American history
Japanese diaspora
Japanese words and phrases